Ramot (lit. "Heights") is an Israeli settlement organized as a moshav, near the eastern shores of the Sea of Galilee in the western Golan Heights. Named "Ramot" because it is located on two hills, it falls under the jurisdiction of Golan Regional Council.

The international community considers Israeli settlements in the Golan Heights illegal under international law, but the Israeli government disputes this.

Geography

History
The moshav was founded in 1969, when Golan area was a part of the Israeli Military Governorate. In 1981, the area of Golan was unilaterally annexed by Israel, applying Israeli civil rule on the area. The founders first lived in the houses of the abandoned village of Skopye, and then settled two years later to temporary "triangle houses" in what is now the Ramot recreation village. In 1973, they resettled in the moshav's current location. The moshav is a member of the Moshavim Movement.

Population
As of 2012, the moshav had 478 settlers.

Economy
The economy of the community is based on irrigated agriculture (bananas, mangos, lychee, palm trees, guava and avocado, and flowers), poultry production, raising cattle for meat and milk, and raising sheep.

Tourism
Ramot is a popular vacation destination. Among the moshav's tourist facilities are a resort hotel, guest houses, and a horse ranch.

References

External links
Official website 

Israeli settlements in the Golan Heights
Moshavim
Golan Regional Council
Populated places in Northern District (Israel)
Populated places established in 1969
1969 establishments in the Israeli Military Governorate